Igor Majcen (born August 24, 1969 in Ljubljana) is a retired male freestyle swimmer from Slovenia. He is a three-time Olympian, making his debut in 1988 for FR Yugoslavia. 

His best Olympic result was finishing in sixth place in the men's 1500 m freestyle event at the 1992 Summer Olympics in Barcelona, Spain. He was named Slovenian Sportsman of the Year in 1993, after having won the bronze medal in the men's 1500 m freestyle event at the 1993 European LC Championships in Sheffield.

References

1969 births
Living people
Slovenian male freestyle swimmers
Olympic swimmers of Slovenia
Olympic swimmers of Yugoslavia
Swimmers at the 1988 Summer Olympics
Swimmers at the 1992 Summer Olympics
Swimmers at the 1996 Summer Olympics
Sportspeople from Ljubljana
European Aquatics Championships medalists in swimming
Yugoslav male freestyle swimmers
Mediterranean Games bronze medalists for Yugoslavia
Swimmers at the 1987 Mediterranean Games
Mediterranean Games medalists in swimming